Issiaka Bamba or Bamba for short (born 31 March 1990) is an Ivorian professional footballer who plays as a forward.

Career

Club
In March 2018, Bamba signed for Armenian Premier League club Gandzasar Kapan until the end of the 2017–18 season.

External links
Profile at SOccerway

References

1990 births
Living people
Association football forwards
Ivorian footballers
Ivorian expatriate footballers
Africa Sports d'Abidjan players
C.S. Marítimo players
Primeira Liga players
Expatriate footballers in Portugal
Expatriate footballers in Belgium
Wydad de Fès players